Associate Professor Ngiam Tee Liang was the Head, Department of Social Work, Faculty of Arts and Social Sciences, National University of Singapore and was a Nominated Member of Parliament in Singapore.

He is one of the pioneers of the social work movement in Singapore, with 40 years of work as a social work educator and community service volunteer. Through the years, Prof Ngiam has been championing social justice through his involvement in numerous projects and panels in prison rehabilitation, youth policy, and family life education.

Prof Ngiam was fostered out when he was one week old until he was 12 years old. It made him wonder about the welfare of youths in the community, and got him started on Social Work. He was educated in Victoria School and University of Singapore.

Selected publications
 "Population ageing in Singapore:  The challenge of using the Central Provident Fund for retirement needs,"  Ageing Matters:  European Policy Lessons from the East. Eds. J Doling, C Jones Finer and T Maltby. Adlershot:  Ashgate, 2005.
 "Contemporary welfare policy and social well-being," Social Work in Context: A Reader. Eds. KK Mehta and A Wee. Singapore: Marshall Cavendish International, 2004.
 "Inclusion of people with disabilities:  Policies and Services," Extending Frontiers:  Social Issues and Social Work in Singapore. Eds. N T Tan and K K Mehta. Singapore: Times Media Private Ltd and Eastern Universities Press, 2002. (In commemoration of 50th anniversary of social work education in Singapore)
 (with Vasoo, S and P P L Cheung), "Singapore's ageing population:  Some emerging trends and issues,"  Ageing in Asia-Pacific Region. Ed. D R Phillips. London: Routledge, 2000.
 (with Low, L), "An underclass among the overclass,"  Singapore:  Towards a Developed Status. Ed. L Low.  Singapore:  Oxford University Press, 1999.

References 

 Pioneers of Our Profession
 Assoc Prof Ngiam Tee Liang
 Ngiam Tee Liang

Living people
Singaporean people of Chinese descent
Singaporean social workers
Academic staff of the National University of Singapore
Victoria School, Singapore alumni
University of Singapore alumni
Singaporean Nominated Members of Parliament
20th-century Singaporean educators
Year of birth missing (living people)